The North–South Commuter Railway (NSCR), also known as the Clark–Calamba Railway, is a  urban rail transit system under construction in the island of Luzon, Philippines. Running from New Clark City in Capas to Calamba, Laguna with 36 stations and four services, the railway was designed to improve connectivity within the Greater Manila Area and will be integrated with the railway network in the region.

Originally planned in the 1990s, the railway project has had a tumultuous history, being repeatedly halted and restarted due to various reasons. The first proposal was the  "Manila–Clark rapid railway" with Spain in the 1990s that was discontinued after disagreements on funding, and during the 2000s, the NorthRail project with China that was discontinued in 2011 due to allegations of overpricing. The current railway line began development in 2013. The project's initial phase was approved in 2015, and construction began in 2019.

Expected to cost , the line is the most expensive railway transportation project in the country. The entire system is expected to be completed by 2029. Upon its completion, the railway will supersede the existing PNR Metro Commuter Line.

History

Background 

During the Spanish and American colonial periods, the Manila Railway Company, later the Manila Railroad Company (MRR), operated various local trains between Manila and its neighboring provinces. By the 1920s, trains ran from Tutuban to Naic in Cavite, Pagsanjan in Laguna, Montalban in Rizal, and Bulacan. The network was heavily damaged in the Battle of Manila during World War II, but was mostly reestablished after the war.

MRR would be succeeded by the Philippine National Railways (PNR) on June 20, 1964. On April 6, 1970, PNR inaugurated the Metro Manila Commuter Service, which started at Manila North Harbor and ended in Biñan station in Laguna. After numerous expansions, the commuter service served thousands of daily riders in its system and had an expansive network in and out of Metro Manila. In 1978, at the request of the Philippine government, the Japan International Cooperation Agency (JICA) conducted a study on the electrification of the commuter service. The plan was made to keep up with the increasing demand for transportation in the region. It called for the replacement of the diesel-run trains and the electrification of the PNR commuter line. Two experts from the Japanese National Railways were sent to conduct the study.

Services north of Manila started to decline in the 1980s. However, commuter services were briefly extended to Malolos starting in 1990 under the Metrotren project but later ceased in 1997. Since then, railway services have been mostly confined to the south, with the contemporary Metro Commuter Line being predominantly aligned to the South Main Line.

Manila–Clark rapid railway system 
During the 1990s, President Fidel Ramos signed a memorandum of agreement with Juan Carlos I of Spain for the construction of a railway line from Manila to Clark in September 1994. This would be known as the Manila–Clark rapid railway system. On August 24, 1995, North Luzon Railways Corporation (NLRC) was formed as a subsidiary of Bases Conversion and Development Authority (BCDA). The NLRC then entered into an engineering, procurement and construction contract with the Spanish Railways Corporation on February 7, 1996, but the contract was later terminated on August 14, 1998, after the parties disagreed on the source of funding for the project.

In September 1999, the National Economic and Development Authority (NEDA) approved the railway project, with the initial phase covering a segment from Caloocan to Calumpit. The source of funding was to be the Obuchi Fund from the Japan Bank for International Cooperation (JBIC). Pre-construction activities such as right-of-way clearing and relocation of affected informal settlers began, but a presidential directive later halted the clearing activities and the JBIC loan was not granted.

NorthRail 

Under the presidency of Gloria Macapagal Arroyo, a successor to the Manila–Clark rapid railway system, the NorthRail project, an  rail line, was conceived. On September 14, 2002, a memorandum of understanding was signed by NorthRail and China National Machinery and Equipment Group (CNMEG) for the project. It was later approved on August 5, 2003. The project was estimated to cost around US$500 million, and the funding was to be covered by a US$400 million loan from the Export–Import Bank of China, and the rest to be shouldered by the government through BCDA and NLRC.

The project involved the upgrading of the existing single track to an elevated dual-track system, converting the rail gauge from narrow gauge to standard gauge, and linking Manila to Malolos in Bulacan and further on to Angeles City, Clark Special Economic Zone and Clark International Airport. The first phase of the project covered the Caloocan to Malolos segment, which spans . Before construction could start, the Philippine Senate raised concerns about alleged corruption in the project. Senator Franklin Drilon commissioned a study from the University of the Philippines, which recommended the cancellation of the railway's construction, citing anomalies in the bidding process and the Buyer Credit Loan Agreement (BCLA) with Exim China. Despite the controversy, preparatory construction began in early November 2006. Civil and design works started in October 2007. Due to delays in the construction work, it was soon renegotiated with the Chinese government. Construction temporarily continued in January 2009 with the support of the North Luzon Railways Corporation.

However, the NorthRail project would be formally cancelled in March 2011, due to persisting legal issues and allegations of overpricing and corruption. Nonetheless, on September 2011, the government expressed its interest to restart the project with Interior and Local Government Secretary Mar Roxas stating that China was open to reconfiguring the project. NEDA Director-General Arsenio Balisacan also stated that NorthRail would resume within the term of President Benigno Aquino III, but despite the announcement the NorthRail project was permanently scrapped and replaced with the NSCR project, although the Philippine government was still obligated to pay the corresponding loans. In March 2012, the Philippine Supreme Court authorized a lower court to hear the case for voiding the contract. Instead of paying the US$184 million owed by the government in 2012, the Department of Finance was to pay the Export-Import Bank of China four installments of US$46 million from September 2012 onwards. On November 6, 2017, DOTr, BCDA, and North Luzon Railways reached an out-of-court settlement with Sinomach (formerly CNMEG), resolving the five-year dispute. It saved the government  in potential payment of claims to Sinomach, and hundreds of millions of pesos in legal fees and arbitration costs.

Development 

With the termination of the NorthRail project, the Department of Transportation and Communications considered restarting the project by commissioning a feasibility study by CPCS Transcom Ltd. of Canada. Part of the study examined having a Malolos–Tutuban–Calamba–Los Baños commuter line. The feasibility study was still ongoing when the NEDA included the North–South Commuter Railway in the Metro Manila Dream Plan, which it approved in 2014.

The plan for the NSCR, a component of the North–South Railway Project, included the  NSCR Phase 1, an electrified narrow gauge commuter railway from Tutuban to Malolos and funded through overseas development assistance; and the second phase which included the reconstruction of the Tutuban–Calamba commuter line and the rehabilitation of long-haul services with an extension up to Matnog, Sorsogon and a branch line from Calamba to Batangas. It was to be funded through a public–private partnership (PPP) scheme.

On February 16, 2015, the NEDA board, chaired by President Benigno Aquino III, approved the NSCR Phase 1 project. After President Aquino met with Japanese Prime Minister Shinzo Abe in Japan in June 2015, Abe expressed his commitment to fund the project. On November 19, 2015, representatives of both countries exchanged notes on the project in the presence of Abe and Aquino. JICA was chosen by the Japanese government to look into financing the project, and on November 27, seven months before Aquino would end his term, JICA and the Department of Finance signed a loan agreement worth ₱97.3 billion ($1.99 billion) for the financing of the first phase.

The succeeding administration included the project under the Build! Build! Build! Infrastructure Program. In addition, numerous changes to the project were made. The railway's gauge was changed to standard gauge, and the railway was extended to New Clark City. In addition, the PPP scheme for the south commuter line was abandoned in favor of overseas development assistance from Japan. On June 25, 2017, transportation secretary Arthur Tugade announced the new name for the project and unveiled the locations of the first five stations during a press tour of the old PNR line.

On January 21, 2019, a loan agreement worth  ( billion) for the North–South Commuter Railway Extension Project (NSCR-Ex), which includes the PNR Clark 2 and Calamba sections, was signed by JICA and the Department of Finance (DOF). Another loan agreement worth  ( billion) for the NSCR-Ex project was signed on July 11 by the Asian Development Bank (ADB) and DOF. JICA would finance the electrical and mechanical systems as well as the trains for the PNR Clark 2 and Calamba sections, while ADB would finance the civil works.

The loan for the civil works of PNR Calamba, worth  ( billion), was approved by the ADB on June 9, 2022. The loan agreement was signed by President Rodrigo Duterte and ADB on June 16. Two more loan agreements were signed on February 9, 2023, during the working visit of President Bongbong Marcos in Japan.

Construction 

Pre-construction works such as clearing of the right of way started on January 5, 2018.  The North–South Commuter Railway is being built in three phases and divided into two primary sections:

 PNR Clark — This is the northern section of the NSCR. Construction was divided into two phases. PNR Clark 1 involves the  Tutuban–Malolos railway, while PNR Clark 2 involves the  Malolos–Clark railway. The  railway line, when fully completed, will run from Tutuban station in Manila to New Clark City station within the Clark Freeport and Special Economic Zone, with a link to Clark International Airport.
 PNR Calamba — Also known as PNR Clark Phase 3, PNR Calamba is the southern section of the NSCR. It involves the reconstruction of the existing Metro Commuter Line as an electrified standard gauge railway with elevated, at-grade, and depressed sections. The  railway will run from Solis station in Manila to Calamba station in Laguna.

The groundbreaking of PNR Clark 1 was held on February 15, 2019, and construction started after. Meanwhile, the groundbreaking of PNR Clark 2 was held on September 18, 2021. PNR Clark is expected to start partial operations in October 2022, with full operations in 2024. , PNR Clark 1 is 51.3% complete, while PNR Clark 2 is 32% complete .

Construction of PNR Calamba is set to begin by 2022, with partial operations slated by 2025 and full operations by March 2029.

Route 
The North–South Commuter Railway will comprise two sections corresponding to the Philippine National Railways' old main lines. The first is the  fully-elevated PNR Clark which is being built over the mostly-defunct North Main Line in northern Metro Manila and Central Luzon. The construction of PNR Clark is further subdivided into two sections: the  PNR Clark 1 between Tutuban and Malolos, and the  PNR Clark 2 from Malolos to New Clark City. The second component is the  PNR Calamba which will use the existing PNR Metro Commuter Line right of way between Tutuban and Calamba, which were historically parts of the South Main Line and will have elevated, at-grade and depressed sections.

Services
There are four classes of services on this line. The following are:
Commuter is the basic commuter rail service and has the least priority. It stops at all stations within its route. There are three routes planned for this class; Tutuban–New Clark City, Tutuban–Calamba, and Clark International Airport–Calamba. The maximum speed for this service will be  for the entire line.
Commuter Express is the limited-stop service for the line, succeeding the Commex service during the Metrotren era in the early 2000s. Although it will run faster than regular commuter trains, it will still use the same routes and rolling stock.
The Airport Limited Express is the temporary designation for the planned airport rail link and limited express service between Clark International Airport and Alabang station. As the flagship NSCR service, it will use dedicated rolling stock complete with intercity-grade amenities plus baggage space for people arriving from the airport. It will have a maximum speed of  along the NSCR North. , the final name for the service is yet to be determined.
Subway through-service is the proposed augmentation between the NSCR and the Metro Manila Subway. It will serve the southernmost areas of Metro Manila and neighboring Laguna, branching from the subway line at FTI station while the remainder of the line will go towards the direction of NAIA Terminal 3 in Pasay. It will use the Subway trainsets instead of the NSCR ones, although both are from the Sustina family.

Stations

Extensions and additional stations 
The Metro Manila Dream Plan proposed a  branch line that will split in Angeles City. The line will have 12 stations and shall end in Tarlac City. The study also proposed a  extension of the NSCR to Batangas City. This will be built parallel to the PNR South Long Haul project which was approved in 2017, with the line being a single-track, standard gauge line without electrification, and will be built at-grade similar to the present PNR network. The PNR has also requested for a feasibility study for a commuter line connecting Tarlac City and San Jose, Nueva Ecija in 2019. The length of the line and the number of stations will be determined once a proposal has been submitted. Another proposed southward extension to Pansol in Calamba, Laguna was proposed by a 2019 JICA report.

The North–South Commuter Railway will also have provisions for infill stations: Malabon, Valenzuela Polo, Tabing Ilog, Tuktukan, and Malolos South.

Infrastructure 
NSCR will be the first commuter rail system in the country to be mostly grade-separated.

Station layout 
All stations will have a standard layout, with a concourse level and a platform level. The stations are designed to adhere to both Philippine and Japanese standards. Stations will either have island platforms or side platforms with platform screen doors. The stations are designed to be barrier-free, and trains shall have spaces for passengers using wheelchairs. Historical stations will be preserved. All stations will have access to intermodal facilities. The FTI station in particular will be connected to the Taguig Integrated Terminal Exchange.

Rolling stock 

The North–South Commuter Railway will have two types of rolling stock: commuter trains and airport express trains. With the exception of wheelchair spaces, the commuter trains will have a capacity of 2,242 passengers. The express trains, on the other hand, will have a capacity of 392 passengers. A total of 464 electric multiple unit traincars have been procured to operate on the line, with 104 of these being the 8-car EM10000 class trainsets to be built by the Japan Transport Engineering Company (J-TREC), successor to the Tokyu Car Corporation that provided rolling stock to the Philippines from 1955 to 1976. The trainsets were previously named as the Sustina Commuter at the time of purchase, and are based on JR East commuter stock such as the E233 series but adapted to standard gauge. The trains are also designed to be interoperable with the Metro Manila Subway.  The trainsets have been designated as the EM10000 class in October 2021. The first batch of the commuter trains arrived on November 21, 2021. The bidding for an order for 304 more commuter cars in a separate contract was opened in September 2020, with the joint venture of Japan Transport Engineering Company and Sumitomo Corporation winning the contract on January 14, 2022. The first EM10000 class train was unveiled on March 18, 2022 and the contract for the 304 cars was signed by the DOTr, Sumitomo, and J-TREC on the same day. The deliveries of the 304 cars are set to be completed by September 2028.

The 56 airport express trainsets, meanwhile, are being procured as of 2019. On February 26, 2021, a suggested preliminary design based on the E259 and E353 series was published. On May 10, the Department of Transportation later announced it will acquire the airport express trainsets from Japanese manufacturers. After several months of delays and rescheduling, three bidders have submitted their designs: Kawasaki Heavy Industries and Sojitz joint venture, Marubeni and Stadler Rail, and Mitsubishi and Construcciones y Auxiliar de Ferrocarriles (CAF).  The contract is expected to be awarded in the last quarter of 2022.

Signalling
Initially, the PNR Clark 1 section of the line was set to use a communications-based train control (CBTC) system. The line will instead use a signalling system based on ETCS Level 2. The subsystems consist of automatic train control (ATC), automatic train protection (ATP), automatic train supervision (ATS), train detection through track circuits, and computer-based interlocking, with provisions for automatic train operation (ATO).

For Phase 1 between Tutuban and Malolos, Hitachi's Italian subsidiary Hitachi Rail STS will be the provider of ETCS Level 2 equipment as part of a contract package covering electrical and mechanical systems, and track works. For Phase 2 between and the NSCR South, Alstom will use its Atlas 200 system for Level 2 signalling.

Tracks
The line will feature an Elastic Sleeper Direct Fasten (ESDF) type ballastless track with concrete sleepers in the mainline and plastic/fiber-reinforced foam urethane railroad ties on turnouts in the mainline and depot. Continuous welded rails will be employed on the mainline, while jointed rails with fishplates will be employed in the depot.  rails will be employed in the mainline while rails built to the JIS 50N rail profile will be used in the depot.

See also 

 Philippine National Railways
 Department of Transportation (DOTr)
 Transportation in the Philippines
 Rail transportation in the Greater Manila Area

Footnotes

References 

Passenger rail transportation in the Philippines
Philippine National Railways
Transportation in Luzon
Transportation in Bulacan
Transportation in Pampanga
Transportation in Tarlac
Rail transportation in Metro Manila
2025 in rail transport
1500 V DC railway electrification